George Green was wrecked on her maiden voyage. She had been launched on 26 December 1829 at Newcastle and was sailing to London to be delivered to her owners when she wrecked on 30 January. She ran aground on the Hasbro' Sands, Norfolk, and subsequently foundered. Her crew were saved. She was valued at £25,000 and insured for £20,500.

A list of ships trading with India under license from the British East India Company indicated that George Green, W.L. Pope, master, was expected to sail to Madras and Bengal.

Citations

1829 ships
Ships built on the River Tyne
Age of Sail merchant ships of England
Maritime incidents in January 1830